Baranagar is a city in West Bengal, India, formerly called Barahanagore.

Baranagar may also refer to:

Places
 Baranagar, is a city of the Indian state of West Bengal, established in 1869
 Bulandshahr, India, earlier known as Baranagar
 Baranagar Municipality, a municipality (civic administration body) of city Baranagar, established in 1869
 Baranagar, Murshidabad, a temple village in West Bengal, India

Constituencies
 Baranagar (Vidhan Sabha constituency)

Schools
 Baranagore Ramakrishna Mission Ashrama High School, a senior secondary boys' school

Transport
 Baranagar Road railway station, a railway station
 Baranagar metro station, a metro railway station

Other uses
 Baranagar Math, first monastery of Ramakrishna Order

See also
 
 

Disambiguation pages